Pterostylis tunstallii, commonly known as Tunstall's greenhood or granite greenhood is a plant in the orchid family Orchidaceae and is endemic to south-eastern Australia. Flowering plants have up to ten transparent green flowers which have a dark brown, insect-like labellum with a blackish "head". Non-flowering plants have a rosette of leaves on a short stalk but flowering plants lack the rosette, instead having five to eight stem leaves.

Description
Pterostylis tunstallii, is a terrestrial,  perennial, deciduous, herb with an underground tuber. The dorsal sepal and petals are fused, forming a hood or "galea" over the column with the dorsal sepal having a short point on its tip. Flowering occurs from July to August.

Taxonomy and naming
Pterostylis tunstallii was first formally described in 1989 by David Jones and Mark Clements and the description was published in Australian Orchid Research. The specific epithet (tunstallii) honours Ronald George Tunstall who collected the type specimen.

Distribution and habitat
Tunstall's greenhood occurs south from Blue Mountains in New South Wales, in southern Victoria east from Wilsons Promontory and in Tasmania including the Bass Strait islands. It grows in moist forest in coastal and near-coastal districts.

References

tunstallii
Endemic orchids of Australia
Orchids of New South Wales
Orchids of Victoria (Australia)
Orchids of Tasmania
Plants described in 1989